Where in the World Is Carmen Sandiego? may refer to the following:

 Carmen Sandiego, a series of educational mystery video games, most of which have been titled Where in the World Is Carmen Sandiego?
 Where in the World Is Carmen Sandiego? (1985 video game), the first game in the series
 Where in the World is Carmen Sandiego? (Prodigy video game), a 1988 online game
 Where in the World Is Carmen Sandiego? Deluxe, a 1990 video game
 Where in the World Is Carmen Sandiego? (1996 video game), based in part on the TV game show
 Where in the World Is Carmen Sandiego? (Gameloft), a 2008 video game
 Where in the World is Carmen Sandiego? 3 - New Carmen Adventure, a 2009 French video game
 Where in the World Is Carmen Sandiego? (2011 video game), a Facebook game
 Carmen Sandiego (franchise), a media franchise also known as Where in the World Is Carmen Sandiego?
 Where in the World Is Carmen Sandiego? (game show), a 1991-1995 children's television game show
 Where in the World Is Carmen Sandiego? (album), a 1992 soundtrack album for the show

See also
 Carmen Sandiego (disambiguation)
 Where in Time Is Carmen Sandiego? (disambiguation)
 Where in the World (disambiguation)